Strings is a 2004 animated fantasy film directed by Anders Rønnow Klarlund about the son of an ostensibly assassinated ruler who sets out to avenge his father but through a series of revelations comes to a much clearer understanding of the conflict between the two peoples concerned. An international co-production by Denmark, Sweden, Norway and the United Kingdom, the film was made with marionettes and the strings are part of the fictional world as life strings.

The world of Strings 
The fact that the characters are played by marionettes is incorporated into the film's fictional universe. That is, the characters are literally marionettes. Wide shots of the countryside reveal millions of strings stretching endlessly into the sky, each one representing an individual on earth. Nobody knows how far the strings reach or who is controlling them. As far as the characters know, the strings are controlled by a higher power.

When a string attached to a moveable limb is severed, it is analogous to amputation; the individual loses the ability to use that body part. Once a string is cut nothing can repair it or bring back to life whatever it was attached to. If the "head string" is cut, it results in permanent death.

Since nothing can reanimate a body part after its string is cut, repairs to injured individuals must be made using healthy, unsevered parts. An unfortunate collection of poor people and prisoners is kept as a donor class. When a person of royalty or other social importance loses a body part, another is involuntarily taken from a prisoner and replaced with its string intact.

Prisons are designed around the fact that the strings reach up endlessly into the sky. Rather than cells, the prisoners are confined underneath huge horizontal grids, and the range of mobility allowed by their strings is limited by small square openings in the grid through which the strings are inserted and locked within.

Instead of giving birth, a couple fashions a new child out of wood. After an unspecified amount of time, a set of luminous new strings gently descends from the sky and is quickly attached to the inanimate infant by the parents. This act immediately and miraculously endows the inert wooden figure with life.

Later, it is also revealed that some people have discovered the ability to "leap" incredible distances and effectively fly for a short time; essentially this is analogous to the puppeteer jerking on the marionette's string and making it soar through the sky. It is only when the protagonist understands the unity of all living things, and the power of love, that he is able to acquire the skill.

Voice cast

Accolades

References

External links

Danish animated fantasy films
Norwegian animated fantasy films
British animated fantasy films
Swedish animated fantasy films
2004 films
2004 animated films
2004 fantasy films
Marionette films
2000s British films
2000s Swedish films
Zentropa films